is a bay located in Hokkaido of Japan, connected to the Sea of Japan. Ishikari Bay is the area east of the straight line from Cape Shakotan on the west of Shakotan Peninsula to Cape Ofuyu.

Geography

Border communities
Shiribeshi Subprefecture
Otaru, Shakotan, Furubira, Yoichi
Ishikari Subprefecture
Ishikari

Rivers
Ishikari, Shinkawa, Hoshioki, etc.

Development

Ports
In Hokkaido, important ports are located in Ishikari Bay.

References

Bays of Japan
Bays of the Sea of Japan
Landforms of Hokkaido